Dylan Hicks (also sometimes known as the Governor of Fun) is an American singer-songwriter and novelist from Minneapolis, Minnesota.

Musical career

Hicks' first three albums were released on the No Alternative label.  After releasing a self-produced cassette and two 45s, his first album "Won" was released in 1996 and recorded with backing band The Golf Ball-Sized Boogie. He released his second CD entitled "Poughkeepsie" in 1998, which was described by Kristy Martin as "a sparkling demo of smart wordplay and pop sensibility." He followed this up with the album "Alive With Pleasure" in 2001.

As a companion to his novel Boarded Windows, Hicks released an album entitled Sings Bolling Greene, which originated when Hicks started writing songs by Bolling Greene, one of the characters in the book. In the book, Greene is a country musician. About half of the songs on Sings Bolling Greene are written from Greene's perspective, while the remaining ones are about Greene.

Hicks' most recent album, Ad Out, was released on October 20, 2017.

Writing career
In 2012, Hicks' debut novel, Boarded Windows, was published by Coffee House Press. It is narrated by a nameless narrator, and is set in Minneapolis in the 1990s. A second novel, Amateurs, was published in May 2016 by Coffee House Press. He has also written for City Pages.

Reception
Courtney Algo and Lit Lyfe wrote in the Twin Cities Daily Planet that "fans of Hicks and rapier-sharp prose will find a great delight in Boarded Windows." A review in MinnPost described the book as "a vivid time capsule of those scruffier days of Twin Cities music fandom," referring to the 1990s.

References

Writers from Minneapolis
Musicians from Minneapolis
Living people
21st-century American novelists
American male novelists
American male singer-songwriters
20th-century American singers
21st-century American singers
Singer-songwriters from Minnesota
21st-century American male writers
Novelists from Minnesota
20th-century American male singers
21st-century American male singers
1970 births